forfone is a free VoIP-application which enables the user to make calls, send and share text messages, photos & the user’s current location. The App does not require any additional registration or user account but allows direct access to all mobile and landline networks worldwide through Wi-Fi, LTE, 3G or UMTS.

100% reachability can be guaranteed by sending push-notifications. To answer calls or receive messages, the App therefore does not have to be open or be running in the background. The application is compatible with every iPhone, iPod Touch or Android device and runs on iOS 4.0 or higher or Android 2.2 or higher. forfone is a VoIP and messaging App which makes internet telephony as easy and intuitive as making a normal phone call through a mobile operator.

Data security
The independent Viennese research institute SBA-Research discovered security holes in messenger applications currently on the market. The researchers were not only able to take over the account, but also send free text messages from the servers of many tested applications. Only at forfone and 3 other applications, it was not possible to take the account over, nor were they able to send or receive text messages of the users.

See also
 Mobile VoIP

References

External links
Official Website
forfone FAQ Archived
GBWhatsapp APK

IOS software
Android (operating system) software
Communication software
Instant messaging clients